Lonicera implexa, the evergreen honeysuckle, is a species of shrub in the family Caprifoliaceae. They are obligate climbers. They have simple, broad leaves and fleshy fruit. Individuals can grow to 2.5 m tall.

Sources

References 

implexa
Flora of Malta